Cloak of Love is the first EP by Genghis Tron, released in 2005. It focuses solely on techno and mathcore, unlike later releases.

The songs "Rock Candy," "Ride the Steambolt" (under the name "Penultimate Just Means Second to Last, You Pretentious Fuck"), and "Laser Bitch" (under the name "Dance, Laser Bitch!") previously appeared on the Laser Bitch demo.

Track listing

Personnel
 Mookie Singerman – lead vocals, keyboards, theremin, guitar, lap steel guitar
 Hamilton Jordan – guitar, drum programming, backing vocals
 Michael Sochynsky – keyboards, drum programming

Additional personnel
 Jake Friedman – additional vocals on track 4
 Colin Marston – engineering, production, mixing, mastering
 Jon Beasley – artwork and design

References

Genghis Tron albums
2005 debut EPs